The Intelligence Co-ordinator, later Security and Intelligence Co-ordinator was a senior post in the Cabinet Office of the British Civil Service that oversaw the intelligence services and their relationship to the government.

Post holders
1968–1972: Sir Dick White
1972–1973: Sir Peter Wilkinson
1973–1978: Sir Leonard Hooper
1978–1980: Sir Brooks Richards
1980–1985: Sir Antony Duff
1985–1989: Sir Colin Figures
1989–1991: Sir Christopher Curwen
1991–1996: Sir Gerald Warner
1996–1999: John Alpass
1999–2000: Michael Pakenham
2000–2001: Peter Ricketts
2001–2002: John Scarlett
Sir David Omand was appointed to the post in 2002, following the September 11 attacks, as a subsidiary role to that of Cabinet Secretary, and served until his retirement in 2005. It was briefly held by Bill Jeffrey in 2005 until his appointment as Permanent Secretary at the Ministry of Defence, when it was granted to Sir Richard Mottram combined with the role of Chairman of the Joint Intelligence Committee to form Permanent Secretary for Intelligence, Security and Resilience.

References

British intelligence agencies
1968 establishments in the United Kingdom